Hiroaki Serizawa (芹澤廣明 Serizawa Hiroaki January 3, 1948 - ) is a Japanese singer and songwriter. He has released albums under two other similar names: Hiro Serizawa (芹沢ヒロ and 芹沢 廣, both said Serizawa Hiro). He has released music for many Mitsuru Adachi anime series, including Touch and Hiatari Ryōkō!

External links 
 Serizawa Hiroaki (goo 映画, in Japanese)
 The Baron / Waka & Hiro Tribute Page (in Japanese)

1948 births
Living people
Japanese male singer-songwriters
Japanese singer-songwriters
People from Yokohama
Musicians from Kanagawa Prefecture